"The World Showcase March" was written in 1982 for the Grand Opening of Epcot Center in Florida.  It was written by the Academy Award winning songwriting team of Robert and Richard Sherman (who also wrote the similarly themed "It's a Small World" 19 years earlier).  The World Showcase March was performed intermittently over the following few years.

References

Epcot
Songs written by the Sherman Brothers
Disney songs
1982 songs
Disney theme park music